Jane Butel is an American cook and television host, specializing in cuisine of the Southwestern United States and Tex-Mex cooking. She has published numerous books, and was the host of the Create Network show Jane Butel's Southwestern Kitchen. She is a graduate of Kansas State University, and founded the Jane Butel Cooking School.

Bibliography
Chili Madness, Workman Publishing Company (1980)
Jane Butel's Tex-Mex Cookbook, Harmony Books (1980)
Hotter Than Hell:  Hot and Spicy Dishes from Around the World, HPBooks (1987)
Fiesta: Southwest Entertaining with Jane Butel, HarperCollins (1987)
Jane Butel's Southwestern Kitchen, HPBooks (1994)
Fiestas for Four Seasons: Southwest Entertaining with Jane Butel, Clear Light Books (1996)
Real Women Eat Chiles, Cooper Square Publishing (2006)

References

External links
Jane Butel Southwestern Cooking website

Living people
American chefs
Southwestern United States
Tex-Mex cuisine
Kansas State University alumni
American food writers
Women food writers
Women cookbook writers
20th-century American women writers
20th-century American non-fiction writers
21st-century American women writers
American women non-fiction writers
21st-century American non-fiction writers
Year of birth missing (living people)